John Charles Pollock (1924 – 6 January 2012) was a Christian author. He was the official biographer of Billy Graham and lived with his wife in rural North Devon, England.

Writings
One of his best known books is The Apostle, A Life of Paul. This book presents Paul the Apostle and his life as taken from his journeys in Biblical times. The story takes the modern day reader back into history. It portrays Paul as he deals with personal issues while trying to deal with his conversion to Christianity. He wrote extensively on William Wilberforce, including a full-length biography (1977) which has never been out of print. He also wrote about John Newton, composer of the hymn Amazing Grace, and was a board member of the John Newton Project.

His other biographies cover many other renowned Christian individuals, including Hudson and Maria Taylor (1965), L. Nelson Bell (1971), D.L. Moody (1972 & 1983) Lord Shaftesbury (1985), and John Wesley (1989); and groups, such as The Siberian Seven (1979) and The Cambridge Seven (1985). In the 1990s, Pollock also wrote biographies of several Victorian figures, including Gordon of Khartoum, Lord Kitchener and Henry Havelock.

Personal life
Pollock was born in London and was educated at Trinity College, Cambridge. He taught teaching history and divinity for two years at Wellington College. He was then rector of a country parish until he became a full-time writer in 1958.

John and his wife Anne, were keen walkers and did not fuss about bad weather; they were frequently to be seen pacing along the Devon lanes in the rain, seemingly impervious to the cold of Exmoor. This strength of resolve was a hallmark of John Pollock's life which was filled with managing woodlands, writing, gardening, family history, music and travelling.

John Pollock was taken ill on a walking holiday in Scotland and died after a short illness on 6 January 2012.

Selected works

References

English non-fiction writers
2012 deaths
Alumni of Trinity College, Cambridge
20th-century English Anglican priests
Evangelical Anglican clergy
1924 births
English male non-fiction writers
Anglican writers
People from North Devon (district)